Evgeny Kirillov was the defending champion. He retired in his second round's match against Yang Tsung-hua.
Dudi Sela won in the final 6–2, 6–1, against Greg Jones.

Seeds

Draw

Finals

Top half

Bottom half

References
Main Draw
Qualifying Singles

2011 ATP Challenger Tour
2011 Singles